My Kind of Gospel is a studio album by American recording artist Wanda Jackson. It was released in 1983 via Vine Records and contained ten tracks of material. It was the twenty ninth studio record released in Jackson's career and among a series of gospel recordings she released during the 1980s decade.

Background, content and release
Wanda Jackson was among the first women to have commercial success in both the country and Rockabilly music genres, releasing a series of singles during the 1950s and 1960s. This included "Let's Have a Party", "Fujiyama Mama", "Right or Wrong" and "The Box It Came In". Jackson transitioned into the gospel genre during the 1970s. After parting ways with her long-time record label, Jackson recorded a series of gospel records for the Vine label in the 1980s. The first Vine release was My Kind of Gospel. Jackson recorded the album alongside producer Gregg Gray at the Associated Recording Studio in Oklahoma City, Oklahoma. Sessions took place in June 1983.

My Kind of Gospel consisted of ten tracks, all of which were gospel-themed. Original recordings on the record included "Life's Journey", "Jesus Gave It to Me" and "Jesus Loves Cowgirls". The album was originally released in 1983 on Vine Records. The project marked Jackson's twenty ninth in her career and her first with Vine. It was originally issued as a vinyl LP. In 1984 it was re-released on Tab Records, a Swedish record label, which had previously issued her 1984 album Rockabilly Fever. It was re-released again in 1986 in the United Kingdom. It was later re-released to digital and streaming sites, including Spotify.

Track listings

Vinyl versions

Digital version

Personnel
All credits are adapted from the liner notes of My Kind of Gospel.

Musical personnel
 Doug Campbell – Steel guitar
 Gregg Gray – Background vocals, keyboards, piano
 Rocky Gribble – Banjo, guitar
 Bill Hamblin – Fiddle
 Wanda Jackson – Lead vocals
 Linda Matheson – Background vocals
 Carolyn McCoy – Background vocals
 Dale McCoy – Background vocals
 Ray Owens – Harmonica
 Marty Schrabel – Bass
 Lynn Williams – Drums

Technical personnel
 Paul Bowman – Percussion
 Gregg Gray – Producer

Release history

References

1983 albums
1984 albums
1986 albums
Wanda Jackson albums